A tamper-evident band or security ring serves as a tamper resistant  or tamper evident function to a screw cap, lid, or closure.   The term tamper-proof is sometimes used but is  considered a misnomer given that pilfering is still technically possible. 

A security band can be integral with the cap  or can be a separate package component.  It is a plastic or metal structure around the circumference (usually) of the closure that is often found attached below a closure in bottles, jars, and tubs.

Several variations have been developed for caps, lids, and closures.
  The use of custom printing and security printing is available. Perforations or other areas of weakness are often used to initiate and control a tear.  Sometimes engineered  frangibility is used for break-away functions.

While tamper-evident bands are not considered a challenge for recycling, it is important that the band stays attached to the cap in case of refillable bottles, because it is hard to remove the rings from intact bottles in an economical way.

The opening ring is a tamper warning: if the seal between the ring and the cap is broken, it is an indication that the cap has been opened.

Purposes
Security opening rings might have several possible purposes:
Provide clear evidence of container being opened
Deter tampering 
Deter  package pilferage
Deter product adulteration
Improved closure strength during shipping
Regulatory requirement (sometimes)

Roll-on metal closures
When an aluminum or plastic bottle cap has an integral band, it is usually connected by thin bridges. They can be molded along with the cap or slit afterwards.  When unscrewing the cap, the frangible ring breaks: the ring can separate from the cap, and two separate pieces remain, the sealing piece and the leftover ring; or the broken ring can form a "pigtail" still attached to the cap.

Shrink bands
Separate bands of shrink film can be placed over the closure and tightened in a shrink tunnel. Some have perforations or nicks to help initiate the tear.

Other
Most standard pressure sensitive tapes do not have a high degree of tamper evidence.  Some special security tapes have additional tamper evident features which offer better tamper evidence. Some have intentional weakness which cause breakage or delamination;  others have hidden messages which appear upon opening.

Examples

See also
List of bottle types, brands and companies
Tamper-evident technology
Tamper resistance
Chicago Tylenol murders

References

Further reading
Yam, K. L., "Encyclopedia of Packaging Technology", John Wiley & Sons, 2009, 
 "Improving Tamper-Evident Packaging: Problems, Tests and Solutions", Jack L. Rosette, 1992

Packaging
Security
Security technology